Breville is an Australian brand of small home appliances, founded in Sydney in 1932. It is best known for its home appliances, specifically blenders, coffee machines, toasters, kettles, microwaves and toaster ovens. , the brand also manufactured "Creatista" coffee machines for Nespresso, and distributed other Nespresso products in Australia, New Zealand and the USA and Canada, including the "Inissia", "Vertuo" and "Citiz" series of machines.

History 

In 1932, Bill O'Brien and Harry Norville (born Charles Henry Norville) mixed their last names together and the Breville brand was created. The company started by making radios. During World War II, it made mine detectors. By 1953, the radio business had been taken over by A.W. Jackson Industries Pty. Ltd., which manufactured radiograms and, later, television sets under the Breville brand. After that, Breville turned its' attention to manufacturing household appliances.

The O'Brien family continued developing the Breville business for three generations, with Bill's son, John, setting up the Breville Research and Development centre in the late 1960s, and his daughter, Barbara, running the marketing department throughout the 1990s. John O'Brien continued to lead many product development initiatives for the Breville brand until his death in December 2003. Breville's R&D team has taken out over 100 active patents and has been awarded more than 40 international design awards. In 1974, Breville released the toasted sandwich maker, which was a huge success, selling 400,000 units in its first year, and making the Breville brand a household name in Australia. Soon after this, the Breville toasted sandwich maker was launched in New Zealand and the United Kingdom, where it was met with similar success.

Ownership 
In 2001, the Breville companies of Australia, New Zealand, and Hong Kong transferred ownership of the brand to Housewares International Limited. The acquisition of the Breville companies caused the group to shift its focus to the electrical business and cease its Australian homewares and cleaning businesses in March 2007. In 2008, Housewares International Limited officially changed its name to the Breville Group Limited. The Breville Group Limited also owns the Kambrook and Sage brands.

Global presence 
Breville trades in over 70 countries including China, Brazil, South Africa, Mexico, and Israel. In 2002, the Breville brand was launched in Canada and the United States.

The company makes contact grills, kettles, espresso machines, toasters, microwave ovens, pressure cookers, coffeemakers, breadmakers, juicers, deep fryers, blenders and food processors.

References

External links
 

Cooking appliance brands
Home appliance brands
Kitchenware brands
Coffee appliance vendors
Espresso machines
Heating, ventilation, and air conditioning companies
Australian brands
Home appliance manufacturers of Australia